Salem Township is one of twelve townships in Pulaski County, Indiana, United States. As of the 2010 census, its population was 1,399, and it contained 602 housing units.

Salem Township was organized in 1843, and most likely was named after Salem Township, Champaign County, Ohio, the native home of a first settler.

Geography

Cities, towns, villages
 Francesville

Adjacent townships
 White Post Township (north)
 Jefferson Township (northeast)
 Beaver Township (east)
 Monon Township, White County (south)
 Hanging Grove Township, Jasper County (west)
 Gillam Township, Jasper County (northwest)

Cemeteries
The township contains these two cemeteries: Nauvoo and Roseland.

Major highways
  U.S. Route 421
  Indiana State Road 114

Airports and landing strips
 Calvert Air Park

Education
 West Central School Corporation

Salem Township is served by the Francesville-Salem Township Public Library in Francesville.

Political districts
 Indiana's 2nd congressional district
 State House District 16
 State Senate District 18

References
 United States Census Bureau 2008 TIGER/Line Shapefiles
 United States Board on Geographic Names (GNIS)
 IndianaMap

External links
 Indiana Township Association
 United Township Association of Indiana

Townships in Pulaski County, Indiana
Townships in Indiana